The Coolidge Dam is a reinforced concrete multiple dome and buttress dam  southeast of Globe, Arizona on the Gila River. Built between 1924 and 1928, the Coolidge Dam was part of the San Carlos Irrigation Project. Coolidge Dam was named after the 30th US president, Calvin Coolidge and was dedicated by President Coolidge on March 4, 1930. The design and construction engineer was Herman Neuffer, who oversaw much of the construction undertaken by the Bureau of Indian Affairs (BIA) during the 1920s in Arizona and New Mexico.

Coolidge Dam impounds San Carlos Lake on the San Carlos Apache Indian Reservation. The project irrigates .

Since the water is impounded so it can be released when farmers need it, San Carlos Lake is often at a low level except in wet periods. When former President Coolidge dedicated the dam in 1930, the dam had not begun to fill. Humorist Will Rogers looked at the grass in the lake bed, and said, "If this were my lake, I'd mow it."

History

Construction
Coolidge Dam was constructed between 1924 and 1928 by the Bureau of Indian Affairs (BIA), which also owns and operates it, at a cost of US$10 million. The overall structure used  of concrete and consists of three domes, which are supported by buttresses on  centers. Two uncontrolled ogee crest spillways are concrete-lined and located on each abutment.

Opposition from Apache tribe
Construction of the dam incurred opposition from the Apache tribe, who feared a violation of their treaty rights, according to an author writing for the Federal Writers' Project:

A compromise was finally made with the Indians, and the tribal burial grounds and the old camp from which Geronimo started his bloody raids now lie deep under the waters of the reservoir. It was proposed to disinter the bodies but the Apache vehemently objected to what they considered desecration of the dead, so a concrete slab was laid over the principal burial ground at a cost of $11,000.

Hydroelectric power generation
As part of the San Carlos Indian Irrigation Project (SCIIP), Coolidge Dam formerly generated electricity from a hydroelectric plant. A diesel electric generating plant also run by the Project was built simultaneously and located on withdrawn land near the town of Coolidge. The latter facility provided power for irrigation wells, local towns, rural users, and mining operations. The diesel generators no longer function, therefore electricity is delivered to SCIP by the Western Area Power Administration. However, flood damage in 1983 rendered the hydroelectric station inoperable and restoration plans have been deemed infeasible. The electric plant at the dam was completed and began generating electricity in 1935, and the diesel plant was completed in December of that year and produced electricity the following year.

Structural modifications
In 1988, the Bureau of Reclamation completed a study that concluded that the dam needed modifications to prevent a failure should a significant flood or an earthquake occur. Earlier floods that had resulted in water topping the dam had eroded the abutments, and the buttresses were judged to be unstable. Work started in 1991 and included an access road to the downstream side of the dam. The work concluded in 1995. The final cost was estimated at $US46.5 million. ($ in  dollars)

Flood of 1993

In January 1993, heavy rainfall (up to three times the normal amount) in Arizona filled San Carlos Lake, and the operators were forced to release excess water. The ground was saturated, and the continuing rainfall ran off into the streams and rivers. In addition, the weather pattern for the year caused higher than normal temperatures in areas that would typically remain under snow. These areas received rain instead of snow, and the rivers began to run earlier and with far more volume than normal. Rivers in the southern part of Arizona at that time contained anywhere from three to nearly six times their normal amount of water. To complicate matters, the snowpack was already 150% the normal amount. Dam operators for Coolidge Dam released water in record levels because storage capacity had been reached.

As a result of the heavy water releases, several El Paso Natural Gas pipelines, which crossed the Gila River near Coolidge, Winkelman, and Kelvin were "scoured" or uncovered by the force of the water and failed. The water flow was concentrated through the release gates, as opposed to letting the water overtop the dam, which would have created a different scour rate. The force of the Gila River undermined and ultimately caused the failure of the north and south abutments of the bridge crossing at Attaway Road, upstream from Coolidge.

Winkleman Flats, a small area near Winkleman, was flooded as well. However, despite earlier concerns about the dam's safety, it survived the flood even though retrofit work was in process at the time.

Recreational use

Fishing and boating
San Carlos Lake is stocked periodically, and when the winter has experienced average or above average precipitation, is one of the largest lakes in Arizona. The San Carlos Apache Tribe Recreation & Wildlife Dept. stocks several species of fish using various methods to create a good fishing environment. Several species are self-sustaining:
 sunfish (Lepomis sp.)
 largemouth bass (Micropterus salmoides)
 black crappie (Pomoxis nigromaculatus)
 channel catfish (Ictalurus punctatus)
 flathead catfish (Pylodictis olivaris)

Other fish are stocked from cold-water fisheries including brown trout and rainbow trout. Jet-skiing, water skiing and boating are allowed. Individuals who are not members of the San Carlos Apache tribe who wish to use the lake must contact the tribal office for a permit since the lake is on tribal land.

Bicycle trail
Bicyclists can ride the access road to the dam face and back. The route is scenic and little-traveled, and rises a total of about 700 feet along the 13 mile route. The elevation at the dam is about the same as the starting point, so the trip is not strictly a climb, but peaks about the middle of the distance and then descends again to about 2,600 ft.

When they reach the dam, cyclists can either return to the starting point along the two-lane paved road, or they can continue eastward along the rougher part of the road until it rejoins U.S. Route 70. Before traveling on the reservation, non-tribe members must obtain a permit. A mountain bike or other rugged type bicycle is recommended for cyclists traveling east from the dam to Rte 70.

References

External links

 USBR Coolidge Dam Website
 
 Southwest Tribal Fisheries Commission – San Carlos Apache Tribe
 The American Southwest: San Carlos Lake
 Coolidge Dam at archive.org

Dams on the National Register of Historic Places in Arizona
Buildings and structures in Gila County, Arizona
Buildings and structures in Pinal County, Arizona
Buttress dams
Dams in Arizona
Gila River
Hydroelectric power plants in Arizona
Former hydroelectric power plants in the United States
United States Bureau of Indian Affairs dams
Dams completed in 1930
Energy infrastructure completed in 1930
Historic American Engineering Record in Arizona
1924 establishments in Arizona
National Register of Historic Places in Gila County, Arizona
Former power stations in Arizona
Native American history of Arizona